Feed the Beast is the debut studio album by American thrash metal band Bonded by Blood, released in 2008 via Earache Records. In 2017, it was ranked number 50 on Loudwire's list "Top 50 Thrash Albums of All Time".

Track listing

Source

Personnel
 Jose Barrales – vocals
 Alex Lee – guitar
 Juan Juarez – guitar
 Ruben Dominguez – bass
 Carlos Regalado – drums

References

2008 debut albums
Bonded by Blood (band) albums
Earache Records albums